Helmut Peine (1902–1970) was a German film, radio and television actor.

In 1961 he played the title role in the four-part television crime series Inspector Hornleigh Intervenes.

Selected filmography
 Only One Night (1950)
 Professor Nachtfalter (1951)
 Sensation in San Remo (1951)
 Poison in the Zoo (1952)
 Operation Sleeping Bag (1955)
  (1965, TV miniseries)

References

Bibliography
 Martin Compart. Crime TV: Lexikon der Krimi-Serien. Bertz + Fischer, 2000.

External links

1902 births
1970 deaths
German male film actors
German male television actors
Actors from Magdeburg